The season began on 23 August 2014 and ended on 7 June 2015.

Format and rules
For the 2014–15, the Slovenian Third League, 3. SNL, was divided into four regional groups with a total of 52 participating clubs. Three groups (i.e. North, Center, East) were composed of 14 clubs, while the West group only had 10 clubs that participated in the competition. The winners of the regular season in each group played a promotional two-legged play-offs to decide which two teams would be promoted to the Slovenian Second League. Reserve teams of the top division sides were ineligible to promote to the second division, due to the rules of the Football Association of Slovenia, which stipulate that one club's main squad and their reserve team must be at least two leagues apart in the country's football pyramid.

The number of relegated teams from each group was determined by the number of regional MNZ's from which the clubs in all four groups are a part of.

MNZ Celje (North)
MNZ Maribor (North)
MNZ Ptuj (North)
MNZG-Kranj (Centre)
MNZ Ljubljana (Centre)
MNZ Lendava (East)
MNZ Murska Sobota (East)
MNZ Koper (West)
MNZ Nova Gorica (West)

This meant that three teams from 3. SNL North were relegated at the end of the season and replaced by the winners of the fourth tier competitions held separately in MNZ Celje, MNZ Maribor and MNZ Ptuj. The number of relegated teams from 3. SNL Centre and 3. SNL East was two, while only the bottom team was relegated from the 3. SNL West as MNZ Koper and MNZ Nova Gorica managed a combined fourth tier competition.

3. SNL Centre

Clubs

League table

3. SNL East

Clubs

League table

3. SNL North

Clubs

1 Stojnci and Videm declined promotion.

League table

3. SNL West

Clubs

League table

Play-offs

First leg

Second leg

Zarica Kranj and Drava Ptuj were promoted to the 2015–16 Slovenian Second League.

See also

2014–15 Slovenian Second League

External links
Football Association of Slovenia 
MNZG-Kranj 
MNZ Murska Sobota 
MNZ Maribor 
MNZ Nova Gorica 

3
Slovenian Third League, 2014-15
Slovenian Third League seasons